Edgar Jones (June 17, 1874 – February 7, 1958) also known as Ed Jones and as "Pardner" Jones, was an American actor, producer, and director of films. He starred in and directed the adaptation of Mildred Mason's The Gold in the Crock. He also starred in and directed Siegmund Lubin films including Fitzhugh's Ride. He established a film production business in Augusta, Maine that produced adaptations of Holman Day novels.

Career
Jones acted in touring stage productions before moving on to films. He starred with Clara Williams in A Lucky Fall.

He acted, produced, and directed Lonesome Corners. He produced, directed, and starred in a series of short films with Evelyn Brent. According to IMDb, he has more than 100 acting credits and more than 60 directing credits. In 1920, he formed his own production company, Edgar Jones Productions, and made films in Maine. His film work includes adaptations of Holman Day stories. The studio operated out of the former Maine Children's Home Society.

Blaine S. Viles, a former mayor of Augusta, served as the film company's president. Viles also served as state forest commissioner. The Mentor reported Holman Day films being shown to prisoners.

He married Lubin actress Louise Huff and they had a daughter together. They divorced.

Among his surviving films is Border River, a 1919 Edgar Jones Production.

Filmography

Actor
A Lucky Fall (1912)
Fitzhugh's Ride (1914)
The Gold in the Crock (1915)
On Bitter Creek (1915)
The Trustee of the Law
A Woman's Fool (1918)
Wild Honey (1918)
Wild Women (1918)
Border River (1919 film) (1919)
The Big Punch (1921)
Single-Handed Sam (1921)
Lonesome Corners (1922)
Lochinvar of the Line
The Two-fisted Judge
A Forest Diplomat
Single Handed (Edgar Jones film)

Director
 The Turmoil (1916 film)
 Dimples (1916 film)
 Lovely Mary (1916)
 The Girl Who Wouldn't Quit (1918)
 A Rich Man's Darling (1918)

Producer
Border River (1919 film)
The Rider of King Log (1921)
The Timber Wolves
A Forest Samson

References

External links

1874 births
1958 deaths
20th-century American male actors
American film producers
American film directors
People from Augusta, Maine